Brigitte Boccone-Pagès (born 8 May 1959) is a Monégasque politician, who has served as the president of the National Council since 6 October 2022. She was elected vice president of the National Council on 22 February 2018. In October 2022, Boccone-Pagès was elected president of the National Council, following the unexpected resignation of Stéphane Valeri, making her the first woman to hold the position. She chose Balthazar Seydoux as her vice president. On 5 February 2023, she topped the poll as her Monegasque National Union won all 24 seats in the 2023 Monegasque general election.

Honors 

 Commander of the Monegasque Associative Order in 2008.
  Commander of the Order of Academic Palms on 9 January 2018.
  Commander of the Order of the Star of Italy on 21 June 2021.

  Officer of the Order of Saint-Charles in November 2021

  Knight of the Legion of Honor in December 2021

References

Living people
Monegasque women in politics
21st-century women politicians
Members of the National Council (Monaco)
1959 births
Presidents of the National Council (Monaco)
Officers of the Order of Saint-Charles
Chevaliers of the Légion d'honneur